Lordotus gibbus is a species of bee fly in the family Bombyliidae.

Subspecies
These two subspecies belong to the species Lordotus gibbus:
 Lordotus gibbus gibbus
 Lordotus gibbus striatus Painter

References

Bombyliidae
Articles created by Qbugbot
Insects described in 1863